Joseph Henry Conroy (November 8, 1858 – March 20, 1939) was an American prelate of the Roman Catholic Church. He served as bishop of the Diocese of Ogdensburg in Northern New York from 1921 until his death in 1939.  He previously served as an auxiliary bishop for the same diocese from 1912 to 1921.

Biography

Early life 
Joseph Conroy was born on November 8, 1858, in Watertown, New York.  He completed his preparatory studies for the priesthood in Canada at the Grand Seminary of Montreal in Montreal and at St. Michael's College in Toronto. Returning to New York, he studied theology at St. Joseph's Seminary in Troy.

Priesthood 
Conroy was ordained to the priesthood for the Diocese of Ogdensburg on June 11, 1881. He was first assigned to the mission at Churubusco, New York, and then served as pastor of a parish in Rouses Point, New York. In April 1883 he was named rector of St. Mary's Cathedral in Ogdensburg, New York. He became vicar general of the diocese in March 1901, and was named a domestic prelate of his holiness in October 1905.

Auxiliary Bishop of Ogdensburg 
On March 11, 1912, Conroy was appointed auxiliary bishop of the Diocese of Ogdensburg and titular bishop of Arindela by Pope Pius X. He received his episcopal consecration on May 1, 1912, from Cardinal John Farley, with Bishops Henry Gabriels and Charles H. Colton serving as co-consecrators, at St. Mary's Cathedral.

Bishop of Ogdensburg 
Following the death of Bishop Gabriels in April 1921, Conroy was named the third bishop of Ogdensburg by Pope Benedict XV on November 21, 1921. He was installed by Cardinal Patrick Hayes on January 18, 1922. In 1935, he allowed Rev. Cyril Stevens to become president of Ticonderoga National Bank, despite canon law forbidding a priest to engage in business.

Joseph Conroy died on March 20, 1939, at age 80.

References

1858 births
1939 deaths
People from Watertown, New York
20th-century Roman Catholic bishops in the United States
Roman Catholic bishops of Ogdensburg